The 1979–80 Connecticut Huskies men's basketball team represented the University of Connecticut in the 1979–80 collegiate men's basketball season. The Huskies completed the season with a 20–9 overall record. The Huskies were members of the Big East Conference where they finished with a 3–3 record. They made it to the first round of the 1980 National Invitation Tournament. The Huskies played their home games at Hugh S. Greer Field House in Storrs, Connecticut, the New Haven Coliseum in New Haven, Connecticut, and the Hartford Civic Center in Hartford, Connecticut and were led by third-year head coach Dom Perno.

Schedule 

|-
!colspan=12 style=""| Regular Season

|-
!colspan=12 style=""| Big East tournament

|-
!colspan=12 style=""| NIT

Schedule Source:

References 

UConn Huskies men's basketball seasons
Connecticut Huskies
Connecticut
Connect
1980 in sports in Connecticut